Derek Bekar (born September 15, 1975) is a Canadian businessman and former professional ice hockey player. Bekar was born in Burnaby, British Columbia.

Playing career 
He played a total of 11 games for the St. Louis Blues, Los Angeles Kings, and the New York Islanders, scoring no points. He was drafted 205th overall by the Blues in the 1995 NHL Entry Draft. He also had spells in Switzerland's Nationalliga A for EHC Basel and in the Deutsche Eishockey Liga in Germany for the Hannover Scorpions and HK Acroni Jesenice of the Austrian Hockey League. He also played briefly in the United Kingdom, playing three games in the British National League with the Dundee Stars.

On February 1, 2009. he moved from Springfield Falcons, who play in the American Hockey League to Lausanne Hockey Club of the Nationalliga B, before finishing his professional career with HYS The Hague in the Netherlands.

Since March 2009 he has been a senior vice president at Glacial Energy.

Career statistics

Awards and honors

External links

1975 births
Living people
Bridgeport Sound Tigers players
Canadian expatriate sportspeople in the United States
Canadian expatriate ice hockey players in Germany
Canadian expatriate ice hockey players in Scotland
Canadian expatriate ice hockey players in Slovenia
Canadian expatriate ice hockey players in Switzerland
Canadian ice hockey centres
Dundee Stars players
ECH Chur players
EHC Basel players
Hannover Scorpions players
HK Acroni Jesenice players
HYS The Hague players
Ice hockey people from British Columbia
Lausanne HC players
Los Angeles Kings players
Manchester Monarchs (AHL) players
New Hampshire Wildcats men's ice hockey players
New York Islanders players
Notre Dame Hounds players
Portland Pirates players
Powell River Kings players
Springfield Falcons players
Sportspeople from Burnaby
St. Louis Blues draft picks
St. Louis Blues players
Worcester IceCats players
Canadian expatriate ice hockey players in the Netherlands